This article lists the major power stations located in Zhejiang Province.

Non-renewable

Coal

Gas

Nuclear

Nuclear

China's first indigenously designed and constructed nuclear power plant

Renewable

Hydroelectric

Conventional

Pumped-storage

Tidal

Wind

Solar

References 

 
Power stations
Zhejiang